James Sanders (born November 11, 1983) is a former American football safety. He was drafted by the New England Patriots in the fourth round of the 2005 NFL Draft. He played college football at Fresno State.

Sanders also played for the Atlanta Falcons and Arizona Cardinals.

College career
After graduating from Monache High School, Sanders attended Fresno State University, where he played for head coach Pat Hill, a former assistant under Patriots head coach Bill Belichick, then coach of the Cleveland Browns. As a freshman in 2002, Sanders was a first-team freshman All-American selection by the Football Writers Association of America and an All-WAC honorable mention. He started every game at strong safety for the second straight year in his 2003 sophomore season, earning first-team All-WAC honors. In his junior season in 2004, Sanders again earned All-WAC honors in what would prove to be his final season at Fresno State.

Professional career

New England Patriots
Sanders was drafted by the New England Patriots in the fourth round of the 2005 NFL Draft (133rd overall). He was subsequently signed by the Patriots in July 2005. He played in 10 games as a rookie in 2005, starting twice. In a Week 14 game against the Buffalo Bills, Sanders returned an interception late in the game 39 yards for a touchdown. Sanders started five of the 16 games he played in during the 2006 season, filling in for an injured Rodney Harrison.

During the 2007 season, fellow safety Eugene Wilson lost his starting spot to Sanders, who went on to start 15 games in the regular season and Super Bowl XLII. He started 14 games in 2008, missing two games in December due to an injury. In March 2009, Sanders agreed to terms with the Patriots on a three-year contract. It was reported that Sanders turned down more money elsewhere to return to the Patriots.

During an August 2, 2009 press conference, Patriots head coach Bill Belichick spoke of Sanders:

Sanders started the first game of the 2009 season before losing his job to Brandon McGowan in Week 2. He suffered a shoulder injury in Week 4 and missed the team's Week 5 game. He regained his starting job in Week 14, and started the final four games of the season as well as the Patriots' playoff loss to the Baltimore Ravens. He finished the season with 48 tackles.

In 2010, Sanders opened the regular season as a starter in the Patriots' base defense following the demotion of Brandon Meriweather, and started two of the first three games. After Meriweather returned as a starter in Week 4, Sanders was the team's third safety until he filled in for an injured Patrick Chung in Weeks 8 and 9. In Week 10, Sanders did not start but was named AFC Defensive Player of the Week after intercepting a Ben Roethlisberger pass and returning it 32 yards for a touchdown in a win over the Pittsburgh Steelers. In the next game against the Indianapolis Colts, Sanders made a game-saving interception at the Patriots' 6-yard line with seconds remaining when he picked off quarterback Peyton Manning's throw as the Colts offense (already in field goal range) was poised to score and either tie the game or take the lead with a touchdown.

Sanders finished the 2010 season with 58 tackles, three interceptions, and one forced fumble in 15 games played (nine starts). He was released by New England on August 29, 2011.

Atlanta Falcons
On August 30, 2011, Sanders signed with the Atlanta Falcons.

Arizona Cardinals
Sanders signed with the Arizona Cardinals on April 4, 2012.

References

External links

 New England Patriots bio

1983 births
Living people
People from Porterville, California
Players of American football from California
Sportspeople from Tulare County, California
African-American players of American football
American football safeties
Fresno State Bulldogs football players
New England Patriots players
Atlanta Falcons players
Arizona Cardinals players
21st-century African-American sportspeople
20th-century African-American people